Acrotaeniini is a tribe of tephritid  or fruit flies in the family Tephritidae.

Genera
Acrotaenia Loew, 1873
Acrotaeniacantha Hendel, 1939
Acrotaeniostola Hendel, 1914
Baryplegma Wulp, 1899
Caenoriata Foote, 1978
Euarestopsis Hering, 1937
Neotaracia Foote, 1978
Polionota Wulp, 1899
Pseudopolionota Lima, 1935
Tetreuaresta Hendel, 1928
Tomoplagia Coquillett, 1910

References

Tephritinae